Nemapogon brandti is a moth of the family Tineidae. It is found in Iran.

References

Moths described in 1986
Nemapogoninae